English Rain is the debut studio album by English singer-songwriter Gabrielle Aplin. It was released on 13 May 2013 and serves as the follow-up to her 2012 extended play, Home. It serves as her first release with a major record label, and was released with Parlophone. The album debuted at number two in the UK Albums Chart, selling over 35,000 copies. It has since been certified gold in the UK for selling 100,000 copies.

Background
On 29 February 2012, Aplin announced that she had signed to Parlophone and began recording her debut album in March 2012. Aplin was confirmed as the soundtrack to the John Lewis 2012 Christmas television advertisement, covering Frankie Goes to Hollywood's "The Power of Love".

On 12 December 2012, Aplin announced that the title of her debut album would be English Rain. In addition, she also unveiled its artwork and release date of 29 April 2013; however, the release date was pushed back by two weeks to 13 May. On 12 March 2013 Aplin released previews of the songs that would appear on the standard edition of English Rain. Aplin also worked with record producer Mike Spencer.

Reception

Critical
The album was generally well received by critics, praising her for her vocals but calling the album safe and not particularly adventurous. Critics praised tracks such as "Salvation" for taking Aplin out of her "comfort zone" and compared "Please Don't Say You Love Me", the album's second single, to Mumford and Sons.

Commercial
English Rain was well received commercially. English Rain debuted at number two in the United Kingdom selling over 35,000 copies, the following week the album fell seven places to number nine. Internationally, the album achieved moderate success, charting at number 11 in Ireland on 19 May; 22 in Australia in 2014; 55 in Belgium and 39 in New Zealand.

On 23 July 2013, Aplin revealed on her Facebook page that English Rain had been certified gold (for selling 100,000 copies).

Promotion

Tours

To promote the album, Aplin went on two tours. The first was a smaller, mini-tour which took place in March 2013, two months before the album's release, to smaller venues; while the second was a larger tour, where Aplin performed at larger venues such as the O2 Shepherd's Bush Empire in London. The second tour took place in Autumn 2013.

Singles
Aplin's cover version of Frankie Goes to Hollywood's 1984 hit "The Power of Love" was released as the album's first and lead single on 9 November 2012 after being sampled in John Lewis' Christmas television advertisement. The song was well received critically and commercially, and entered the UK Singles Chart at number 36. It peaked at number one on 9 December 2012. Aplin's version was certified gold in the United Kingdom on 11 January 2013.

"Please Don't Say You Love Me" was released as the album's second single on 10 February and serves as the singer's first original single signed to Parlophone. On the week ending 16 February, the song debuted at number six on the UK Singles Chart, serving as her highest debut on the chart.

Aplin announced live on 17 February Radio 1 Chart Show that her third single would be "Panic Cord", a song taken from the singer's second EP, Never Fade. It was released on 5 May, a week prior to the album's release, and peaked at number 19 on the UK Singles Chart.

"Home" serves as the fourth single from the album. Shooting for the music video began on 20 May 2013 and the video was unveiled on 9 June.
The single was released on 14 July and peaked at number 48 in the UK. "Home" was also featured on the ninth episode of Wentworth.

"Salvation" serves as the fifth single from the album, released on 12 January 2014. A music video for the song premiered on 3 December 2013.

Track listing

Charts

Weekly charts

Year-end charts

Certifications

Release history

References

2013 debut albums
Parlophone albums
Gabrielle Aplin albums